Brinsmead can refer to the following persons:
Robert Brinsmead (1934), Australian and controversial former Seventh-day Adventist.
Hesba Fay Brinsmead (born Hesba Fay Hungerford, 1922–2003), Australian author of children's books and environmentalist.
Horace Brinsmead (1883 - 1934), Australian aviation pioneer
John Brinsmead, piano brand.

or to the following locations:
 Brinsmead, Queensland, a suburb of Cairns in Australia